Thiratoscirtus mastigophorus is a species or jumping spider in the genus Thiratoscirtus that lives in the Democratic Republic of the Congo. It was first described in 2013.

References

Salticidae
Spiders described in 2013
Spiders of Africa
Fauna of the Democratic Republic of the Congo
Endemic fauna of the Democratic Republic of the Congo